Louis-Marie-Victor d'Aumont de Rochebaron (1632–1704) was a French Army officer and courtier who served Louis XIV in various capacities, including Premier Gentilhomme de la Chambre du Roi and as Governor of Paris.

In 1666, he assumed by Royal Licence the name de Villequier, and was styled marquis de Villequier until he succeeded to the dukedom of Aumont upon the death of his father Marshal Antoine d'Aumont de Rochebaron, 1st Duke of Aumont in 1669.

He first married, on 21 November 1660, Madeleine Fare, daughter of Michel Le Tellier, marquis de Barbezieux, by whom he had five children, including 
Louis d'Aumont (1667–1723), the 3rd Duke (who married Olympe, daughter of Antoine de Brouilly, marquis de Piennes) and was French Ambassador to London; 
He married a second time to Françoise Angélique de la Mothe Houdancourt, daughter of Philippe de La Mothe-Houdancourt and Louise de Prie. 
Other descendants include the Grimaldis Princes of Monaco, via Princess Louise-Félicité-Victoire de Monaco née d'Aumont, a great-granddaughter.

See also 
 Aumont family
 Villequier-Aumont

References

External links 
 
 www.burkespeerage.com

1632 births
1704 deaths
Military personnel from Paris
Nobility from Paris
Louis
University of Paris alumni
Military governors of Paris
Louis
17th-century peers of France
18th-century peers of France